The Wentworth River is a river of the Coromandel Peninsula, in the Waikato Region of New Zealand's North Island. It flows northeast from the Coromandel Range to reach the Bay of Plenty at Whangamatā.

See also
List of rivers of New Zealand

References

Thames-Coromandel District
Rivers of Waikato
Rivers of New Zealand